Bees Saal Baad is a 1989 Hindi-language Indian horror film directed by Rajkumar Kohli, starring Mithun Chakraborty, Dimple Kapadia, Meenakshi Sheshadri, Vinod Mehra, Amjad Khan, Shakti Kapoor, Anupam Kher, and Om Prakash.

Plot
The film begins with Suraj and Nisha in love and soon to be married. Thakur, who lusted for Nisha, kills Suraj, and as a result Nisha commits suicide.

Twenty years later, Kiran is the only child of wealthy widower Thakur. While she resides in Britain, her dad lives in a palatial house in rural India. When the time comes for her to return home, her dad arrives at the airport to receive and is surprised to see her in the company of a young man, who she later introduces as her husband Suraj. Thakur is shocked to see that he resembles the Suraj he murdered twenty years ago. Thakur overcomes his shock at seeing Suraj, but welcomes him.

While driving, Suraj sees a woman in white blocking the road, but the driver is unable to stop the car in time. They alight from the car and note that no one is on the road. That night, Suraj has a dream about a woman clad in white who is summoning him, claiming that she is Nisha, his wife from a previous birth. Using her magical powers she inserts a nail in one of Suraj's legs on a new moon night. All she has to do is wait for the next new moon, when she inserts another nail in Suraj's other foot, and then waits for Karva Chouth, the day that will put him completely under her control.

Nisha has an old score to settle with Thakur. A frantic Kiran will not give up her husband to Nisha so she and her dad seek help from Tantrik Baba and Bhavani Baba. Will the Tantrik and Bhavani be able to assist them or will they too fall prey to the vengeful spirit?

Cast

Mithun Chakraborty as Suraj 
Dimple Kapadia as Nisha 
Meenakshi Sheshadri as Kiran Thakur 
Vinod Mehra as Inspector Verma 
Amjad Khan as Bhavani Baba
Om Prakash as Sarju 
Shiva Rindani as Badal 
Anupam Kher as Thakur 
Shakti Kapoor as Tantrik Baba 
Jagdeep as Chedhu 
Aruna Irani as Mithi 
Jankidas as Jankidas (Broker) 
Pinchoo Kapoor as Senior Police Officer 
Shiva Rindani as Badal 
Jayshree T. as Tara

Soundtrack

The music composed by Laxmikant–Pyarelal.

References

 

1988 films
1980s Hindi-language films
Indian horror films
Films scored by Laxmikant–Pyarelal
1988 horror films
Hindi-language horror films